Kršan is a village and municipality in the eastern part of Istria County, Croatia.

Description 
It is located in the eastern part of Istria, west of mountain Učka and south-west of Čepić field, on the state road D64 between county center Pazin (D48) and village Vozilići (D66). It is 12 km north of town Labin, and 22 km south-east of town Pazin.

The old town, medieval castle (mentioned 1274), lies on the hill, while new town and village is along the road. According to tradition, the name is derived from the rocky karst hill on which was built, .

There are twenty three settlements in the municipality, and the census of 2011 had recorded: Blaškovići (149), Boljevići (86), Čambarelići (154), Jesenovik (57), Kostrčani (30), Kožljak (160), Kršan (238), Lanišće (74), Lazarići (96), Letaj (43), Nova Vas (69), Plomin (113), Plomin Luka (173), Polje Čepić (148), Potpićan (518), Purgarija Čepić (228), Stepčići (40), Šušnjevica (69), Veljaki (120), Vozilići (236), Zagorje (116), Zankovci (8), Zatka Čepić (31).

Castle history 

The castle is first mentioned in 1274 as Castrum Carsach, in a peace agreement between Aquileia patriarch Raimondo della Torre, and Count Albert I of Gorizia who in the conflict that started in 1268 during patriarch Gregorio di Montelongo conquered and destroyed the fortified settlement. It was abandoned until the 13th or early 14th century, when it was rebuilt by  Heinrich III. Until 1374, when counts of Gorizia became extinct, it was in duality of governance, between the real masters Counts of Gorizia, and Aquileia church in which name the Counts ruled over the castle. When the counts extinct it wasn't returned to Aquleia patriarchs (the state Patria del Friuli), but was inherited by Habsburg family.

The Habsburg family gave it to their vassal Krotendorfer or Cherstlein family, who after the castle had attribute "Karscheyner", and later also acquired Šumber castle. Since then the castle is mentioned as Kršan (Kerschan). They kept it until 1631, with short interruptions when its lords were families Devinski (1388–99), Walsee (1399–1431) and Wolf (1431–36). Later as lords are mentioned de Fini, Auersperg, Rampelli, Benvenuti dell Argenti, Josip de Sussani (who found the Istrian Demarcation from 13th-14th century), then his nephew Franjo Scribani, then nobleman from Plomin Matija Tonetti, and as last Giovanni Tonetti.

From the medieval castle is well preserved the tower of quadrangular layout, while residential and defensive complex was renovated in new residential buildings. The town is entered on the east side of the completely preserved city gate, on the right hand the city defense wall leans a number of houses of which the first is the old municipal house. In the inner courtyard of the castle has been preserved foursquare frame of Gothic portal from the 15th century, and well throat with engraved year 1666. The two-nave parish church of St. Antun was built in the 17th century, and the most of the church furniture dates from the 18th century. At the cemetery is nave chapel of St. Jakov from the 15th century. On the floor of the church, paved with brick and stone, are gravestones of feudal lords from the 15th, 16th and 17th century, particularly the plate from 1415 of Juraj Kršanski in a Latin epitaph inscribed with Gothic letters.

Demography

Municipality Kršan 

Note: Emerged from old Labin municipality. In 1857, 1869, 1921 and 1931 part of the data is contained in municipality Pićan, and in the same time Kršan contains data od Sveta Nedelja municipality.

Kršan (village) 

Note: In 1857, 1869, 1921 and 1931 contains data for villages Blaškovići, Boljevići, Čamberilići, Lazarići and Veljaki.

Gallery

References 

Bibliography

 
 
 

Sources

External links 

Krsan – Chersano: “Survey about Istrian Land Boundaries (Istarski razvod)”

Municipalities of Croatia
Populated places in Istria County
Castles in Croatia